The Mark Twain Memorial Bridge is a bridge over the Mississippi River at Hannibal, Missouri, childhood home of Mark Twain, for whom the bridge is named. The bridge, north of the original bridge, was finished in 2000.  The bridge carries traffic for Interstate 72 and U.S. Highway 36. The state of Missouri has put up a stone picture of Twain on the Missouri side of the bridge.

The bridge opened to traffic on September 16, 2000. As part of the construction project, U.S. 36 was rerouted farther north, eliminating a dangerous sharp curve that had been on the Missouri approach. The cost of the bridge was $55 million.

See also 
 
 
 
 
 List of crossings of the Upper Mississippi River

References 

Truss bridges in the United States
Bridges over the Mississippi River
Road bridges in Illinois
Bridges in Pike County, Illinois
Buildings and structures in Marion County, Missouri
Mark Twain
Quincy–Hannibal area
Bridges completed in 2000
Bridges on the Interstate Highway System
Bridges of the United States Numbered Highway System
U.S. Route 36
Road bridges in Missouri
Interstate 72
Great River Road
Interstate vehicle bridges in the United States